The Gardens of Trauttmansdorff Castle are botanical gardens located on the grounds of Trauttmansdorff Castle in Meran, Italy. The gardens are open daily in the warmer months; an admission fee is charged.

History
The gardens were initially laid out circa 1850 by Count Joseph von Trauttmansdorff (1788-1870) during the castle's restoration. Empress Elisabeth of Austria was a frequent visitor to Meran and the gardens. A bronze bust in her memory was placed in the gardens after her assassination in Geneva in 1898.

After being used for other purposes the original gardens disappeared. Between 1994 and 2001 a completely new garden was planted around the castle. In 2001 the new Trauttmansdorff botanical gardens were opened to public.

Gardens 
Today the castle grounds contain about 80 dedicated gardens with local and exotic plants, organized by region of origin, including typical landscapes of South Tyrol. Principal features of interest include:

 Forests of the world – conifers and deciduous trees from the Americas and Asia.
 Oleander Steps – flowering oleander, an ancient olive tree, etc.
 Sun Gardens – cultivated plants of the Mediterranean, including cypress, figs, grapevines, lavender, and Italy's northernmost olive grove.
 Water and Terraced Gardens – various gardens, including a formal Italian garden, English garden, and sensual garden.
 The landscapes of South Tyrol – testimony of the ancient vegetation of the Valle dell'Adige.

The gardens also contain Aesculapian Snakes in their natural habitat, courtesy of the Alpine Zoo of Innsbruck, an aviary, a Japanese alluvial forest, rice terraces, and tea plantations.

See also 
 Grandi Giardini Italiani
 List of botanical gardens in Italy

References 

 Gardens of Trauttmansdorff Castle
 BGCI entry
 Udo Bernhart, Ulrike Dubis, Trauttmansdorff - Die Gärten / Giardini / The Gardens, BLV Buchverlag GmbH & Co, 2006. .

External links 

 Homepage of the Gardens of Trauttmansdorff Castle

Botanical gardens in Italy
Parks in South Tyrol
Merano
Gardens in Trentino-Alto Adige/Südtirol